Pamela J. Joyner (born 1957/1958) is an American businesswoman and art collector, and has been called an "activist collector" by ArtReview, for her focus on African-American art from the 1940s onwards.

Early life
Joyner is the daughter of teacher Gloria O. Joyner and psychologist Lewis B. Joyner. She earned a bachelor's degree from Dartmouth College and an MBA from Harvard Business School.

Career
Joyner is the founding partner of Avid Partners, a San Francisco-based marketing firm providing consulting services for private equity and capital venture funds.

In January 2019, Joyner commenced a five-year term as chair of the Tate Americas Foundation. She is a member of the board of the Art Institute of Chicago and of the J. Paul Getty Trust.

Personal life
In September 2004, Joyner married Alfred J. Giuffrida in San Francisco, both having been previously married. Together with her husband Fred J. Giuffrida, they have created the Joyner/Giuffrida Collection of African-American art.

References

External links
 Conversations with Collectors: Pamela Joyner, Frieze, 30 January 2017

Living people
American art collectors
1950s births
Dartmouth College alumni
Harvard Business School alumni
African-American businesspeople
21st-century African-American people
20th-century African-American people